Shahab al-Muhajir is an Islamist terrorist, serving as the Emir of Islamic State – Khorasan Province (IS-KP or IS-K) since 2020. His real name is Sanaullah Ghafari. He is a citizen of Iraq according to an analysis by BBC News and Center for Strategic and International Studies (CSIS). His nickname al-Muhajir means "The Migrant" in English. He also uses the alias Sanaullah al-Sadiq. 

When IS-K was established in Afghanistan, Hafiz Saeed Khan was its chief and his deputy Abdul Rauf Aliza, a former member of Taliban. The United States carried out airstrikes killing Aliza in 2015 and Hafiz Saeed Khan in 2016. In 2020, al-Muhajir was instated as its leader and head of operations of IS-K becoming its mastermind and main figure. He is also reportedly the first non-Afghan or non-Pakistani national to head the IS-K group.

Formerly Shahab al-Muhajir was a mid-level Haqqani network commander (an Islamist militant group affiliated with the Taliban) and a member of Al-Qaeda before defecting and becoming the leader of the ISIS-K greatly opposed to the Taliban. After the 2021 Kabul airport attack masterminded by al-Muhajir, the Taliban announced that they would take every possible measure to capture him.

On 21 December 2021, the United Nations Security Council ISIL (Da’esh) and Al-Qaida Sanctions Committee added al-Muhajir (under his real name, "Sanaullah Ghafari"), to their sanctions list.

On 22 December 2021, the Council of the European Union followed the UN by adding al-Muhajir (also under his real name), to their sanctions list.

References 

1994 births
Living people
Iraqi al-Qaeda members
Islamic State of Iraq and the Levant members from Iraq
Islamic State of Iraq and the Levant in Afghanistan
Leaders of Islamic terror groups